Ailton Ferreira Silva (born 16 March 1995), commonly known as Ailton, is a Brazilian professional footballer who plays as a left back.

Career

Fluminense and loans
Having started his career with Brazilian side Fluminense, Ailton moved to Azerbaijan Premier League side Neftchi Baku on a season-long loan deal in June 2015,. The following season, Ailton moved to Portuguese Primeira Liga side Estoril on a season-long loan deal.

VfB Stuttgart and loans
In July 2017, Ailton joined VfB Stuttgart and agreed to a four-year-contract. The transfer fee paid to Estoril was reported as close to €1 million.

On 25 January 2018, Ailton was loaned out to Estoril until the end of the season.

For the 2018–19 season he was loaned out to Braga.

On 4 July 2019, Ailton was loaned out at Qarabağ until the end of the season.

Midtjylland
Ailton moved to Danish Superliga club FC Midtjylland on a permanent transfer on 1 February 2021, the last day of the 2020–21 transfer window.

Pafos
On 24 August 2021, Pafos announced the signing of Ailton.

Rodina Moscow
On 20 September 2022, Rodina Moscow announced the signing of Ailton.

Career statistics

References

External links
 

1995 births
Living people
Sportspeople from Bahia
Association football defenders
Brazilian footballers
Campeonato Brasileiro Série A players
Azerbaijan Premier League players
Primeira Liga players
Bundesliga players
Danish Superliga players
Cypriot First Division players
Fluminense FC players
G.D. Estoril Praia players
VfB Stuttgart players
S.C. Braga players
Neftçi PFK players
Qarabağ FK players
FC Midtjylland players
Pafos FC players
Brazilian expatriate footballers
Brazilian expatriate sportspeople in Azerbaijan
Expatriate footballers in Azerbaijan
Brazilian expatriate sportspeople in Portugal
Expatriate footballers in Portugal
Brazilian expatriate sportspeople in Germany
Expatriate footballers in Germany
Brazilian expatriate sportspeople in Denmark
Expatriate men's footballers in Denmark
Brazilian expatriate sportspeople in Cyprus
Expatriate footballers in Cyprus
Brazilian expatriate sportspeople in Russia
Expatriate footballers in Russia